Silautiya is a village development committee in Rupandehi District in Lumbini Province of southern Nepal. At the time of the 1991 Nepal census it had a population of 2762 people living in 417 individual households.

Notable people

Krishna Chaudhary (1989)
 Shankar Chaudhary (1989)

References

www.hamarmarchawar.webs.com

Populated places in Rupandehi District